The Skinner Boys: Guardians of the Lost Secrets is a children's animated television series. Its first season of 26 episodes screened on 9Go! on 6 July 2014 as part of Kids' WB. The second season screened in 2017.

Plot
The Skinner brothers Charles, Henry and Edward, inherit the Skinner Mansion from their explorer grandfather Augustus Skinner. Along with their teenage cousin Tara, they become the guardians of a collection of unique artifacts he has collected from across the world which possess incredible powers.

Cast
 Paul Tylak as Charles Skinner
 Damian Clarke as Henry Skinner
 Derek Siow as Edward Skinner
 Emma Tate as Julia Skinner
 Lisa Moule as Tara Skinner
 Dan Russell as Wellington

Episodes

Season 1 (2014)

 Nothing to Fear
 Freezer Burn
 The Drums of Doom
 The Conflict Stone
 The Eye of the Golden Snake
 The Curse of the Ghost Train
 The Castle of the Lost
 The Mirror of Middlestep
 The Dangers of the Deep
 The Fire Opal
 The Fountain of Youth
 Grimm and Grimmer
 The Wings of the Butterfly
 Edward Saves the World
 The Dragon's Breath
 The Curse of Invisibility
 The Crystal of Creation
 The Sacred Scarab
 The Molewhistle of East Grinsmead
 The Swampies of the Deep South
 The Lantern of Truth
 The Ice Crystal
 The Festival of the Ancestors
 The Blood Bossom
 The Tibetan Map of Destiny
 Grandpa Skinner's Journal

Season 2 (2017)

 The Body Clock of Tingri-La
 The Crown of Ra
 Logi's Shield
 The Chimes of Change
 Snakes Alive
 The Ravenstone
 The Wand of Enchantment
 The Frog of Fertility
 The Goblet of Goodearth
 The Volcano Eggs
 The Yeti and the Stone Maker
 SOS Nessie
 The Belt of Heracles
 The Claw of the Werewolf
 The Wishing Band
 Yes Edward, Pixies Are Real
 The Crystal Salt Shaker of Awesomeness
 No Strings Attached
 Tabula Rasa
 The Carpathian Cookbook
 The Bluebird of Happiness
 Into Thin Air
 Beware the Drop Bear
 The Bear and the Wolf
 The Hand of Oblivion
 The Compass of Rattlesnake Ridge

References

External links 
 Description at ZDF Enterprises
 Description at SLR Productions

2014 American television series debuts
2010s American animated television series
2014 Australian television series debuts
2010s Australian animated television series
2014 Irish television series debuts
American children's animated adventure television series
American children's animated drama television series
American children's animated horror television series
American children's animated mystery television series
Australian children's animated adventure television series
Australian children's animated drama television series
Australian children's animated horror television series
Australian children's animated mystery television series
Irish children's animated adventure television series
9Go! original programming
Animated television series about brothers